The Armed Forces of the Republic of the Congo, also less formally denoted as the Forces armées congolaises or its acronym FAC, are the military forces of the Republic of the Congo. The dissolution of French Equatorial Africa in 1958, and France's impending military withdrawal from the Congo in August 1960, provided the impetuous for the formation of the FAC. The FAC and state paramilitary agencies are headed by an Armed Forces Chief of General Staff, usually appointed by the President of the Republic of the Congo. Major General Guy Blanchard Okoï has served as chief of staff since 2012.

History
The Congolese military was created on January 16, 1961, and reflected the nature of the colonial security forces, which recruited among the country's northern ethnic groups and were staffed by junior Bakongo officers and a handful of French senior commissioned officers. President Alphonse Massamba-Débat, who seized power in 1963, expelled all the French personnel and sidelined the military in favor of independent political militias, which were trained by Cuban troops. The militias and the Congo's civil defense corps were later integrated with the FAC as the Armée Nationale Populaire.

Under the People's Republic of the Congo, the FAC was again reorganized, with Mbochi career soldiers making up the bulk of the new officer corps; its effectiveness and standards, however, were gradually eroded by draconian political purges throughout the 1970s. A second major setback occurred during the 1990s, when mass desertions led to many FAC officers and enlisted troops joining regional militias. The FAC was reformed for the third time after the Second Congo War, incorporating many former rebels and militia combatants.

On 5 February 2012, there were munitions explosions at a tank regiment (seemingly 'Regiment Blinde') barracks located in Brazzaville's fifth arrondissement, Ouenzé. Some 206 people were initially reported killed. There are five military barracks in the city, and after the explosion officials said the government had promised to move all munitions out of the capital.

Army

Infantry weapons

Armoured fighting vehicles

Artillery

Air defense

Navy

The Navy has around 800 personnel. In October 2007, the US Navy provided some training to Congolese Navy personnel in Pointe-Noire, a port city that is the second largest settlement in the country.

As of 2016 it was commanded by Rear Admiral Andre Bouagnabea-Moundanza.

As of 2019 the Navy operates a single Mil Mi-14 helicopter.

Air Force

After achieving independence from France in 1960, the Congolese Air Force (Force Aerienne Congolaise) was started with equipment such as the Douglas C-47s, Broussards and Bell 47Gs, these were followed by Nord Noratlas tactical transports and Sud Alouette helicopter. In the 1970s the air force switched to Soviet equipment. This included five Ilyushin IL-14 and six turboprop Antonov An-24 transports and an An-26 in return for providing bases for Cuban MiG-17 operations over Angola. These fighters and a few MiG-15UTI combat trainers were transferred to the FAC. In 1990 these fighter were replaced by 16 USSR supplied MiG-21MF/bis Fishbeds plus a couple of MiG-21US trainers. Together with a Soviet training mission which stayed until late 1991, during that time there were numerous accidents that involved both Soviet and Congolese personnel. After the Soviets left there was only limited funding for MiG operations and they were withdrawn. Six Mi-8 helicopters were delivered from Ukraine in mid-1997 before the Cobra rebel takeover.

In 1990, the Air Force was reformed into its present state. Most fighter aircraft it possessed were scrapped in 2001. France and China provided most training to the Air Force in recent times.

See the article Congolese Air Force for current inventory.

References